In the 2006 Canadian federal election, the Bloc Québécois ran candidates in all 75 ridings of the province of Quebec. Some Bloc Québécois candidates of them have their separate pages, but all can be found here with relevant information.

Candidates

Alain Charette

A professional pilot and a teacher, he also ran in the 2004 election, where he finished second, 9% behind Liberal incumbent Marcel Proulx. In 2006 he ran and lost again in Hull—Aylmer, this time only 3.6% behind Proulx despite dropping over 3%. Proulx lost more votes, most of which were gained by the Conservatives and New Democrats. Hull-Aylmer is one of the most federalist ridings in Quebec.

Alain Charette is a founding member of "Le Québec, Un Pays", a Quebec separatist group, currently led by Edith Gendron, the wife of Gatineau MP Richard Nadeau.

2006
Candidates in the 2006 Canadian federal election